Greta is a 2018 psychological thriller film directed by Neil Jordan and written by Ray Wright and Jordan. The film stars Isabelle Huppert, Chloë Grace Moretz, Maika Monroe, Colm Feore and Stephen Rea, and follows a young woman as she befriends a lonely widow who becomes disturbingly obsessed with her.

Greta held its world premiere at the Toronto International Film Festival on 6 September 2018. It was theatrically released on 1 March 2019 in the United States, by Focus Features. The film has grossed over $18 million worldwide and received mixed reviews from critics.

Plot

Frances McCullen (Chloë Grace Moretz) is a young waitress living in New York City with her friend and roommate Erica (Maika Monroe). Frances is still reeling from the death of her mother one year prior, and maintains a strained relationship with her workaholic father Chris (Colm Feore). One morning, Frances finds a handbag on a subway train; the ID inside confirms the bag belongs to a Greta Hideg (Isabelle Huppert). Frances visits Greta the next day to return the bag and the kindly Greta invites her in for coffee.

Greta tells Frances she is a widow from France, and her daughter Nicola is still there, studying in Paris. Frances begins to spend time with Greta to keep her company, visiting the church where her husband played the organ, and helping her adopt a dog, despite Erica's objections that their friendship is unnatural. One night while having dinner at Greta's, Frances finds a closet full of multiple handbags, identical to the one she found on the train. Attached to the bags are names and phone numbers, including Frances's own.

Frances, disturbed by her discovery, decides to cut ties with Greta. Greta begins to stalk Frances, seeing herself as a replacement for Frances's late mother; she rings her multiple times and even turns up at the restaurant where Frances works, and sits outside, staring at her. Greta also stalks Erica; Frances and Erica pursue a restraining order, but are told the process could take months. Frances later meets a former lover of Greta's daughter, and finds out how deep Greta's lies run: not only is she really Hungarian and not French, Greta's daughter actually committed suicide four years ago due to her mother's sadistic behavior, and that Greta suffers with mental illness. Later that night, Greta shows up at the restaurant again, and insists to Frances that her mother had to die for them to meet, eventually causing a disturbing scene that results in Greta being hospitalized and Frances getting fired.

Frances is torn between going home with her father or going on vacation with Erica. Erica then suggests Frances lie to Greta, saying she is going away while secretly hiding in their apartment. The next morning, Frances is drugged and kidnapped by Greta; she locks Frances in a wooden toy chest in a secret room, then uses Frances's cell phone to separately text Erica and Chris, telling each that Frances is with the other. When Frances is released from the chest, she finds articles of clothing and IDs of other young women Greta had previously kidnapped; it is implied that Greta has killed all of them.

Erica and Chris eventually get together and learn that Frances is not with either of them. As time passes, Greta forces Frances to learn Hungarian and how to play the piano, trying to make her her new "daughter". During a cooking lesson, while Greta is distracted, Frances cuts off Greta's little finger with a cookie cutter and knocks her unconscious with a rolling pin. She tries to escape but finds that all the doors and windows are sealed. Frances runs into the basement to search for an exit and finds one of Greta's previous victims under a plastic sheet. Greta sneaks up behind Frances and suffocates her until she passes out.

Chris hires Cody, a private investigator, to find his daughter and investigate Greta. Cody learns that Greta was formerly a nurse until she was dismissed for misusing anaesthetics. Cody meets with Greta in her home. Frances, gagged and bound, attempts to get his attention by shaking the bed, but Greta blocks out the noise with music. When Greta is out of the room, Cody figures out there is a secret room behind the piano. Greta suddenly appears and plunges a syringe into his neck. He draws his gun as he loses consciousness, and Greta uses it to shoot him dead.

An indeterminate amount of time passes. Greta leaves another handbag on the subway and a young woman brings it to Greta's home. She invites the girl in and makes them a pot of coffee; Greta drinks her cup and starts to feel faint. The woman suddenly loses her Southern accent, takes off her wig, and reveals herself to be Erica, having drugged Greta's cup. She reveals that she has been searching for the handbag on the subway for a long time. Greta passes out and Erica finds Frances. As they try to escape, Greta, regaining consciousness, emerges from the shadows and grabs Frances's face before passing out again.

Erica and Frances place Greta's unconscious body in the toy chest and leave, using a metal Eiffel Tower trinket to lock it shut. After they leave the room to call the police, Greta begins to rattle the lid of the chest and the trinket shifts.

Cast

Production
In May 2017, it was announced that Isabelle Huppert and Chloë Grace Moretz had signed to star in the film, then titled The Widow. In August 2017, Maika Monroe joined the cast. In September 2017, Stephen Rea, Colm Feore, and Zawe Ashton were added as well.

The film was produced by Metropolitan Films in cooperation with Lawrence Bender Films, Little Wave Productions and Sidney Kimmel Entertainment. It also received an €650,000 production grant from the Irish Film Board.

Principal photography took place in and around Dublin, beginning in October 2017. It was also filmed on location in Toronto and New York City.

Release
The film had its world premiere at the Toronto International Film Festival on 6 September 2018. Shortly after, Focus Features acquired distribution rights to the film for $4 million, though some sources believed the number was as high as $6 million. It was theatrically released on 1 March 2019 in the United States.

Reception

Box office
In the United States and Canada, Greta was released alongside A Madea Family Funeral, and was projected to gross around $6million from 2,000 theaters in its opening weekend. It made $1.6 million on its first day, including $350,000 from Thursday night previews. It went on to debut to $4.6 million, finishing eighth at the box office.

Critical response
The website's critical consensus reads, "A bonkers B movie that's occasionally elevated by its A-list talent, Greta dives headlong into camp and struggles to stay afloat." On Metacritic, the film has a weighted average score of 54 out of 100, based on 42 critics, indicating "mixed or average reviews". Audiences polled by CinemaScore gave the film an average grade of "C" on an A+ to F scale, while those at PostTrak gave it an average 2 out of 5 stars and a 34% "definite recommend".

References

External links
 
 
 
 

2018 films
2018 psychological thriller films
2010s serial killer films
American psychological thriller films
American serial killer films
Films about kidnapping
Films about stalking
Films directed by Neil Jordan
Films produced by Lawrence Bender
Films produced by Sidney Kimmel
Films scored by Javier Navarrete
Films set in New York City
Films shot in New York City
Films shot in the Republic of Ireland
Films shot in Toronto
Irish thriller films
English-language Irish films
Sidney Kimmel Entertainment films
Screen Ireland films
2010s English-language films
2010s American films